Pitcairnia tillandsioides is a plant species in the genus Pitcairnia. This species is endemic to Mexico.

References

tillandsioides
Endemic flora of Mexico